The 2000 United States presidential election in Kansas took place on November 7, 2000, and was part of the 2000 United States presidential election. Voters chose six representatives, or electors to the Electoral College, who voted for president and vice president.

Kansas was won by Governor George W. Bush. He won all of the congressional districts and counties in the state, except for Douglas County and Wyandotte County. Gore won Douglas with just 45.8% of the vote. Nader also had his best performance by far in Douglas, where he got over 10% of the vote. Bush performed very well in the first district, which is the western and most rural part of the state.

Results

By county

Counties that flipped from Democratic to Republican
Atchison (Largest city: Atchison)
Crawford (Largest city: Pittsburg)

By congressional district
Bush won all 4 congressional districts, including one held by a Democrat.

Electors

Technically the voters of Kansas cast their ballots for electors: representatives to the Electoral College. Kansas is allocated 6 electors because it has 4 congressional districts and 2 senators. All candidates who appear on the ballot or qualify to receive write-in votes must submit a list of 6 electors, who pledge to vote for their candidate and his or her running mate. Whoever wins the majority of votes in the state is awarded all 6 electoral votes. Their chosen electors then vote for president and vice president. Although electors are pledged to their candidate and running mate, they are not obligated to vote for them. An elector who votes for someone other than his or her candidate is known as a faithless elector.

The electors of each state and the District of Columbia met on December 18, 2000 to cast their votes for president and vice president. The Electoral College itself never meets as one body. Instead the electors from each state and the District of Columbia met in their respective capitols.

The following were the members of the Electoral College from the state. All were pledged to and voted for George W. Bush and Dick Cheney:
Shari Caywood
Gene Eastin
Richard Eckert
Susan Estes
Mark Heitz
Charles Hostetler

See also
 United States presidential elections in Kansas
 Presidency of George W. Bush

References

Kansas
2000 Kansas elections
2000